The word passerelle is a French word that means "footbridge" or "gangway." In the theatre, it refers to a small catwalk that extends from one side of the stage to the other, passing in front of the orchestra pit. Besides increasing the total stage area, this stage design allows performers to be closer to the audience.

Notable examples
One of the most prominent uses of a passerelle has been in the Broadway productions of the musical Hello, Dolly!. Notably, the show's memorable  title song is staged – in part – on the passerelle.

References

Parts of a theatre
Stage terminology